Sensemayá is a composition for orchestra by the Mexican composer Silvestre Revueltas, which is based on the poem of the same title by the Cuban poet Nicolás Guillén. It is one of Revueltas's most famous compositions.

Poem
Guillén's poem evokes a ritual Afro-Caribbean chant performed while killing a snake:

The poem "Sensemayá" is based on Afro-Cuban religious cults, preserved in the cabildos, self-organized social clubs for the African slaves. African religions were transmitted from generation to generation. In this poem we meet an adept known as the mayombero. He is knowledgeable in the area of herbal medicine, as well as being the leader of rituals. In Sensemayá, the mayombero leads a ritual which offers the sacrifice of a snake to a god. One of the main motives in Sensemayá is based on this word mayombero. This chant "mayombe, bombe mayombé", is an example of Guillén's use of repetition, derived from an actual ceremony.

Orchestral composition
Revueltas first composed Sensemayá in Mexico City in 1937, in a version for small orchestra. In 1938, he expanded it into a full-scale orchestral work for 27 wind instruments (woodwinds and brass), 14 percussion instruments, and strings. As one advertising blurb for the score describes it:
The work begins with a slow trill in the bass clarinet as the percussion plays the sinuous, syncopated rhythm that drives the work. Soon a solo bassoon enters playing an eerie but rhythmic ostinato bassline. The tuba then enters playing the first of this work's two major themes, a muscular, ominous motif. Other brass join in to play the theme, growing louder and more emphatic, but rigorously yoked to the underlying rhythm. Eventually the horns blast as loudly as they can, with obsessive trills on the low clarinets far underneath, and the strings enter with the slashing second theme. The brass take up this new theme and bring it to a climax, after which the music returns to its opening texture. This recapitulation brings with it a mood of foreboding. The rhythm becomes even more obsessive, and finally the music reaches a massive climax during which both themes are played, overlapping, sometimes in part and sometimes in whole, by the entire orchestra in what sounds like a musical riot. The coda feels like the final dropping of a knife.

Instrumentation 
The score of the second version of Revueltas's composition calls for a large orchestra consisting of:
 woodwinds: 4 flutes (2 doubling piccolos), 2 oboes, an English horn, a piccolo clarinet in E-flat, 2 soprano clarinets in B-flat, a bass clarinet, 3 bassoons, a contrabassoon;
 brasses: 4 horns in F, 4 trumpets in C, 3 trombones and a tuba;
 timpani and percussion (3 players): xylophone, claves, maracas, raspador, gourd, small Indian drum, bass drum, 2 tom-toms (high and low), cymbals, 2 gongs (large and small), a glockenspiel;
 keyboards: a piano, a celesta;
 strings: violins (1st and 2nd), violas, violoncellos and basses.

Notes

Sources

Further reading

 Ellis, Keith. 1983. Cuba's Nicolás Guillén: Poetry and Ideology. Toronto: University of Toronto Press.
 González Aktories, Susana, and Roberto Kolb. 1997. Sensemayá: Un juego de espejos entre música y poesía. México: JGH Editores. .
 González Aktories, Susana, and Roberto Kolb. 2011. "Sensemayá, entre rito, palabra y sonido: transposición intersemiótica y ecfrasis como condiciones de una mitopoiesis literaria y musical". In Entre artes, entre actos: Écfrasis e intermedialidad, edited by Susana Gonzáles Aktories and Irene Artigas, 293–316. México: UNAM.
Hoag, Charles K. 1987. "Sensemayá: A Chant for Killing a Snake." Latin American Music Review / Revista de Música Latinoamericana 8, no. 2 (Autumn): 172–84.
Jacobs, Glenn. Cuba's Bola de Nieve: A Creative Looking Glass for Culture and the Artistic Self. Latin American Music Review / Revista de Música Latinoamericana 9, no. 1 (Spring–Summer): 18–49.
Kaufman, Christopher. 1991. "Sensemayá: The Layer Procedures of Silvestre Revueltas". DMA thesis. Ithaca, New York: Cornell University.
 Malone, Andrew Lindemann. n.d. "Sensemaya, for orchestra". Allmusic.com (accessed 30 October 2015).
Mayer-Serra, Otto. 1941. "Silvestre Revueltas and Musical Nationalism in Mexico." Musical Quarterly 27:123–45.
 Rodríguez, Nilo. 1974. "Guillén va con la música". In Recopilación de textos sobre Nicolás Guillén, edited by Nancy Morejón, 171–75. Serie Valoración Múltiple. Havana: Casa de las Américas.
 Sardinha, Dennis. 1976. The Poetry of Nicolás Guillén: An Introduction. London and Port of Spain: New Beacon Books. ; .
 Williams, Lorna V. 1982. Self and Society in the Poetry of Nicolás Guillén. Baltimore: Johns Hopkins University Press.
Zohn-Muldoon, Ricardo. 1998. "The Song of the Snake: Silvestre Revueltas' Sensemayá." Latin American Music Review / Revista de Música Latinoamericana 19, no. 2 (Autumn): 133–59.

External links 
 Text of the poem (English and Spanish)

 Revueltas's Sensemayá, Leonard Bernstein's marked copy of the published study score (Schirmer). Leon Levy Digital Collection: International Era 1943–1970. New York Philharmonic Digital Archive (Accessed 6 July 2012).
Revueltas's Sensemayá, Leonard Bernstein's marked copy of the manuscript full score. Leon Levy Digital Collection: International Era 1943–1970. New York Philharmonic Digital Archive (Accessed 6 July 2012).

Symphonic poems
Compositions by Silvestre Revueltas
1937 compositions